Symphygas is a genus of moths belonging to the subfamily Tortricinae of the family Tortricidae. It contains only one species, Symphygas nephaula, which is found in Australia, where it has been recorded from Tasmania. The habitat consists of subalpine open forests at altitudes between 950 and 1,100 meters.

The wingspan is about 13.5 mm for males and 14.5 mm for females.

See also
List of Tortricidae genera

References

External links
tortricidae.com

Tortricinae
Taxa named by Edward Meyrick
Monotypic moth genera
Moths described in 1910
Moths of Australia
Tortricidae genera